Witchekan Lake 117D is an Indian reserve of the Witchekan Lake First Nation in Saskatchewan. It is 16 kilometres north of Spiritwood. In the 2016 Canadian Census, it recorded a population of 325 living in 73 of its 80 total private dwellings. In the same year, its Community Well-Being index was calculated at 46 of 100, compared to 58.4 for the average First Nations community and 77.5 for the average non-Indigenous community.

References

Indian reserves in Saskatchewan
Division No. 16, Saskatchewan